Emily E. Brodsky is a Professor of Earth Sciences at the University of California, Santa Cruz. She studies the fundamental physical properties of earthquakes, as well as the seismology of volcanoes and landslides.

Early life and education 
Brodsky earned her bachelor's degree magna cum laude at Harvard University in 1995. Whilst there, she set up Harvard Undergraduate Television. Brodsky moved to California for her PhD, completing her doctorate in 2001 from California Institute of Technology. She worked on rectified diffusion theory, the mechanism that describes how strain waves pump volatile organic compounds into bubbles. Rectified diffusion theory can move dynamic strain from a volcanic tremor or tectonic earthquake to static strain inside a magma chamber. Soon after graduating Brodsky joined the University of California, Santa Cruz. Here she helped several National Science Foundation-MARGINS postdoctoral fellows, including Heather M. Savage and Christie D. Rowe, begin their careers in geophysics.

Research and career 

Brodsky has extensively studied the physics of earthquakes. She has investigated what causes earthquakes to trigger, as well as their hydrogeology and fault zone structure. The impact of earthquakes on subsequent earthquakes ('triggering') is still not well understood. Brodsky demonstrated that seismic waves can trigger regional seismicity. She found that dynamic stress waves from one earthquake can initiate further earthquakes. She has challenged the idea that static stress controls earthquake triggering, and found that aftershocks have similar distributions as main shocks. She showed that using the amplitude of previous earthquakes it is possible to predict earthquake triggering at all distances. By studying the Salton Sea geothermal field, Brodsky showed that there was a relationship between human activity and seismic activity.  Fault slips can cause nearby rocks to fracture, changing the shape of the surface underneath them and turning the rocks on the floor into powder.

She became interested in the permeability of fractured rocks, demonstrating that seismic waves can unclog fractures. Brodsky identified that the build up of pressure can cause changes in groundwater during earthquakes. After earthquakes, Brodsky drills deep within the fault zone to monitor the temperature. She studied the 2011 Tōhoku earthquake and tsunami, finding a series of temperature pulses that occur due to the flow of fluids through a zone of increased permeability. Immediately after an earthquake, the fault zone can be damaged and have higher permeability, but heals within a few months. Generally, earthquakes are triggered when tectonic stress overcomes friction, and Brodsky became interested in what causes this friction in the first place. Brodsky has shown that the coefficient of friction after the 2011 Tōhoku earthquake and tsunami was considerably lower than expected. Alongside earthquakes, Brodsky studies volcanoes, geysers, landslides and rivers. Occasionally, volcanoes are triggered by distant earthquakes. Brodsky predicted that, alongside growth of bubbles and overturn of magma chambers, volcanoes could be triggered by failure of rocks surrounding a magma chamber.

Brodsky serves on the board of directors for the Southern California Earthquake Center and the IRIS Consortium. She has written for The Conversation.

Awards 
Her awards and honours include;

 2005 Seismological Society of America Charles Richter Early Career Award
 2008 American Geophysical Union James B. Macelwane Medal
 2009 National Science Foundation Earthscope Distinguished Lecturer
 2017 International Ocean Discovery Program Ocean Discovery Distinguished Lecturer
 2019 Geological Society of America George P. Woollard Award
 2021 Price Medal of the Royal Astronomical Society

Selected publications

References 

Women geophysicists
Women geologists
American women geologists
American earth scientists
California Institute of Technology alumni
Harvard University alumni
Living people
Year of birth missing (living people)
21st-century American women